List of reasons written by Justice Bertha Wilson during her time as puisne justice of the Supreme Court of Canada.

1982-1985
 Shell Oil Co. v. Commissioner of Patents, [1982] 2 S.C.R. 536
 Kamloops (City) v. Nielsen, [1984] 2 S.C.R. 2
 Guerin v. The Queen [1984] 2 S.C.R. 335 (Concurrence)
 Singh v. Minister of Employment and Immigration, [1985] 1 S.C.R. 177 (Majority)
 R. v. Big M Drug Mart Ltd., [1985] 1 S.C.R. 295 (Concurrence)
 Operation Dismantle v. The Queen [1985] 1 S.C.R. 441 (Concurrence)
 Reference re Section 94(2) of the Motor Vehicle Act, [1985] 2 S.C.R. 486 (Concurrence)

1986-1989
 Clarkson v. The Queen, [1986] 1 S.C.R. 383 (Majority)
 Société des Acadiens v. Association of Parents, [1986] 1 S.C.R. 549
 Mills v. The Queen, [1986] 1 S.C.R. 863 (Dissent)
 R. v. Jones, [1986] 2 S.C.R. 284 (Dissent)
 R. v. Edwards Books and Art Ltd., [1986] 2 S.C.R. 713 (Dissent)
 Kosmopolous v. Constitution Insurance Co. of Canada, [1987] 1 S.C.R. 2 (Majority)
 Canada v. Schmidt, [1987] 1 S.C.R. 500 (Concurrence)
 R. v. Rahey, [1987] 1 S.C.R. 588 (Concurrence)
 R. v. Béland, [1987] 2 S.C.R. 398 (Dissent)
 R. v. Wigglesworth, [1987] 2 S.C.R. 541 (Majority)
 R. v. Morgentaler, [1988] (Concurrence)
 R. v. Stevens, [1988] 1 S.C.R. 1153 (Dissent)
 R. v. Strachan, [1988] 2 S.C.R. 980
 Sobeys Stores Ltd. v. Yeomans and Labour Standards Tribunal (NS), [1989] 1 S.C.R. 238 (Majority)
 Andrews v. Law Society of British Columbia, [1989] 1 S.C.R. 143 (Majority)
 Hunter Engineering Co. v. Syncrude Canada Ltd., [1989] 1 S.C.R. 426 (Dissent)
 United States of America v. Cotroni; United States of America v. El Zein, [1989] 1 S.C.R. 1469 (Dissent)
 Irwin Toy Ltd. v. Quebec (Attorney General), [1989] 1 S.C.R. 927 (Majority)
 R. v. Turpin, [1989] 1 S.C.R. 1296 (Majority)
 Mackeigan v. Hickman, [1989] 2 S.C.R. 796 (Dissent)

1990-1991
 R. v. Lavallee, [1990] 1 S.C.R. 852 (Majority)
 R. v. Skinner, [1990] 1 S.C.R. 1235 (Dissent)
 R. v. Hebert, [1990] 2 S.C.R. 151
 Alberta Dairy Pool v. Alberta (Human Rights Commission), [1990] 2 S.C.R. 489 (Majority)
 R. v. Hess; R. v. Nguyen, [1990] 2 S.C.R. 906 (Majority)
 R. v. Askov, [1990] 2 S.C.R. 1199 (Concurrence)
 R. v. Wong, [1990] 3 S.C.R. 36 (Dissent)
 McKinney v. The University of Guelph [1990] 3 S.C.R. 229 (Dissent)
 Douglas/Kwantlen Faculty Assn. v. Douglas College, [1990] 3 S.C.R. 570 (Concurrence)
 R. v. Chaulk, [1990] 3 S.C.R. 1303 (Concurrence)
 Lavigne v. Ontario Public Service Employees Union, [1991] 2 S.C.R. 211 (Concurrence)

Wilson